Motherwell Football Club is an association football club from Motherwell, North Lanarkshire, Scotland. They were established on 10 May 1886 following a merger between Glencairn and Alpha. They play their home games at Fir Park Stadium.

This is an official list of the managers who have managed Motherwell, and the success that they have achieved, since 1911. Before that year, a committee was involved in the management of the club. The Club's first ever manager was John 'Sailor' Hunter, who would go on to become the club's longest-serving manager. It was during his tenure that Motherwell won their first, and to date, only Premier League title, in the 1931-32 season. This was the same year that The Steelmen had their greatest ever team, scoring a record 119 league goals in one season.

George Stevenson, who succeeded Hunter as Motherwell manager, is the club's most successful manager, winning the League Cup and Scottish Cup in 9 years at Fir Park.

Managerial Performances in the League

The following lists are broken down into the level of league that Motherwell were in at the time they were league winners or runners-up. In recent times up till now, the Scottish Premier League would be classed as the 1st tier of the Scottish football league system while the Scottish First Division would be classed as the 2nd, instead of the first as had been the case.

First tier

Second tier

Managerial Performances in Domestic Cup Competitions

The following lists documents Motherwell's success in the two premier cup competitions in Scotland, the Scottish Cup and the Scottish League Cup, as per manager.

Scottish Cup

Scottish League Cup

Managerial Statistics in the League
Below is the full Scottish league record of every Motherwell manager. Only league games are stated.

As of 20 November 2021.

Sources

Notes

References

External links
Soccerbase

Managers
 
Motherwell
Managers